Christos Stefanopoulos (Greek: Χρήστος Στεφανόπουλος, 1853 in Elis – 1918) was a Greek politician and mayor of Pyrgos.

Christos Stefanopoulos was born in Divri and was the son of Stefanos Stefanopoulos the elder, a politician and member of the historic Stephanopoulos family.  He studied law at Athens and was married to Fani Vakalopoulou. His sons were Stefanos Stefanopoulos, prime minister of Greece, and Georgios Stefanopoulos, member of parliament.

In the first years of his political career, he was mayor of Divri. He was elected representative for Elis in the Greek parliament in 1885, 1887, 1892, 1895, 1902, 1905 and 1906. In 1907, he was elected mayor of Pyrgos, a position he held until his death in 1918.

References

1853 births
1918 deaths
Greek politicians
Politicians from Elis
Mayors of places in Greece
People from Elis